Langley School is a secondary school with academy status situated in the Metropolitan Borough of Solihull, West Midlands. It has specialist status in the arts, languages and training.

The school is a mixed, 11–16 comprehensive school with a current pupil roll of 1002. In September 2002 the school became a specialist Performing Arts College, in 2006 a specialist Language College and Training School.

Alumni
Elizabeth Bower, Actress
Roberto Cipolla, professor
Darren Carter, footballer
Ashley Sammons, footballer
Phil Hawker, footballer
 Charlie Lakin, footballer

References

External links
Langley School Website
Ofsted Report

Academies in Solihull
Training schools in England
Secondary schools in Solihull